Jules Lismonde (known professional as simply Lismonde; 14 May 1908 – 12 March 2001) was a Belgian painter and drawer. He was a member of the Royal Academy of Science, Letters and Fine Arts of Belgium.

Biography 
Lismonde lived in the villa called « Les Roches » where he spent 50 years of his life with his wife Albertine De Wispelaere (6 August 190823 October 1997).

Beginnings 
Lismonde started drawing as a child, and was brought up in an artistic family that admired the work of Steinlen, Forain and fashionable English drawers.

While a student at the Royal Athenaeum of Brussels, he collaborated to the Pallas review by publishing his drawings and caricatures there.

Since he played the flute, he hesitated between a musical and artistic career, but he settled on the visual arts.

As a young man, as early as 1925, he started painting the Brabantian countryside with painter Edgar Bytebier [fr] (1875-1940).

Career 
After practicing oil painting, of which there remain a few examples (portraits, landscapes), he became passionate about drawing in a refined expression in black and white. It was also then that he discovered etching.

In 1934, Jean Groffier [fr] wrote : « As a painter, let it be said, Lismonde was not a colorist. Under the painter's brush, a drawer was hiding. His colour is sad, wary, his effects are gray; but of a delicious melancholy. Actually, the "landscaper" that is Lismonde is one of the most interesting characters of the Belgian visual arts world and whose name will soon cross our borders. ».

Though he did not exactly fit into any artistic "school", he participated in 1945 in the creation of the movement  « Jeune Peinture belge [fr] » and to the group called « Cap d'Encre ».

Lismonde was also a portrait painter and he completed in the 1930s and 40s a series of portraits, especially in charcoal, of personalities from the intellectual and literary world of his time like the poets Luc Indestege, Maurice Carême, Gaston Heux [fr], the writers Constant Burniaux [fr], Louis Lebeer, the philosopher Marcel De Corte [fr], the architect Léon Van Dievoet or the painters Charles Dehoy [fr] or Jacques Veraart [fr].

Exhibitions 
His first personal exhibition took place in 1930 where his paintings were particularly popular.

An exhibition of his works at the Palais des Beaux-Arts in Brussels in 1953 officially consecrated his art.

Then he had personal exhibitions in Venice, Sao Paulo, Tokyo, and the Stedelijk Museum in Amsterdam in 1950. The 9th biennale of Black&White of Lugano dedicated him a room. In 1958, he represented Belgium at the 1958 Venice Biennale where he won the Renato Carrain Prize.

There are tapestries and a sculpture by him in the Pétillon metro station in Brussels.

Documentary 
In 1978, Patrick Van Antwerpen produced a documentary on Lismonde.

The Lismonde Foundation 
Lismonde donated his house to the municipality of Linkebeek, it now serves as a place for music, meetings and exhibitions.

Gallery

See also 

 Belgian pavilion of the Venice Biennale

Notes and references

Further reading 

 1934 : Jean Groffier, « Le paysagiste Lismonde », in Tribune 1934, n° 15, Brussels, September 1934.
 1956 : Louis Lebeer, Lismonde, Brussels, 1956.
 1961 : K. J. Geirlandt, « Lismonde », in Het 5de wiel, no 4, November–December, 1961.
 1977 : Philippe Roberts-Jones, Lismonde, Brussels, Laconti, 1977.
 1983 : Guy Waltenier et Denise Lelarge, « Hommage à Lismonde à l'occasion de son soixante-quinzième anniversaire », in L'Intermédiaire des généalogistes, Brussels, no 223, 1/1983, p. 63-69.
 1992 : M. Draguet (under the direction of), Catalogue de l'exposition Lismonde au Centre culturel de la Communauté française Le Botanique,  26 mars/17 mai 1992, Brussels, 1992.
 2010 : Karel Logist, « En poésie avec Dr Roberts et M. Jones », in Le Carnet et les Instants, n ° 160, Brussels, February–March 2010, p. 19-20.
 2010 : Philippe Roberts-Jones, « LISMONDE », in Nouvelle Biographie nationale, Brussels, Académie Royale de Belgique, volume 10, sub verbo.
 2011 : Robert Diederich, « Lismonde, un monde en noir et blanc », in Anderlechtensia, bulletin du Cercle d'Archéologie, folklore et histoire d'Anderlecht, March 2011, n° 139, p. 25-30.
 2013 : Daphné Parée, « Lismonde Jules », dans Dictionnaire d'Histoire de Bruxelles, Brussels, 2013, p. 503-504.
 2014 : Serge Goyens de Heusch, Lismonde. Catalogue raisonné, Linkebeek, 2014 (avec CD rom).
 2016 : Serge Goyens de Heusch, Lismonde portraitiste, publié à l'occasion de l'exposition Lismonde portraitiste présentée à la Maison Lismonde du 10 janvier au 20 mars 2016.
 2017 : Serge Goyens de Heusch, Lismonde et Philippe Roberts-Jones : cinquante ans d'amitié, Linkebeek, 2017.
 2018 : Serge Goyens de Heusch, Lismonde et l'architecture, Linkebeek, 2018.

Belgian painters
1908 births
2001 deaths